This article serves as an index - as complete as possible - of all the honorific orders or similar decorations received by the Perlis royal family, classified by continent, awarding country and recipient.

The Raja of Perlis and members of the Raja's family have received many honours from different states of Malaysia and from other nations.

Sultanate of Perlis 

They have been awarded:

 Tuanku Sirajuddin of Perlis :
  Founding Grand Master of the Royal Family Order of Perlis (since 17 May 2001)
  Grand Master of the Perlis Family Order of the Gallant Prince Syed Putra Jamalullail (since 17 April 2000)
  Grand Master of the Order of Dato Bendahara Sri Jamalullail (since 2006)
  Grand Master of the Order of the Gallant Prince Syed Sirajuddin Jamalullail (since 2001)
  Grand Master of the Order of Prince Syed Sirajuddin Jamalullail of Perlis (since 2005)
 Order of the Gallant Prince Syed Putra Jamalullail : Knight Grand Companion (SSPJ, 4.12.1995) and Grand Master (since 17 April 2000)
  Grand Master of the Order of the Crown of Perlis (since 17 April 2000)
 Tuanku Fauziah (Tuanku Sirajuddin of Perlis's wife) :
  Recipient of the Perlis Family Order of the Gallant Prince Syed Putra Jamalullail (DK, 13.12.2001)
 Knight Grand Companion of the Order of the Gallant Prince Syed Putra Jamalullail (SSPJ, 4.12.1995)
  Knight Grand Commander of the Order of the Crown of Perlis or Star of Safi (SPMP, 15.2.1967)
 Tuanku Syed Faizuddin Putra Jamalullail (Tuanku Sirajuddin of Perlis's son) :
   Recipient of the Perlis Family Order of the Gallant Prince Syed Putra Jamalullail (DK, 13.12.2001)
  Knight Grand Commander of the Order of the Crown of Perlis or Star of Safi (SPMP, 17.5.1998)
 Tuanku Lailatul Shahreen (Tuanku Syed Faizuddin Putra Jamalullail's wife) :
  Knight Grand Commander of the Order of the Crown of Perlis or Star of Safi (SPMP, 17.5.2002)
 Sharifah Fazira (Tuanku Sirajuddin of Perlis's daughter) :
  Knight Grand Commander of the Order of the Crown of Perlis or Star of Safi (SPMP, 17.5.2002)
  Y.Bhg. Dato’ Paduka Mohammad Ya’acob bin Dato' Sri Aziz ul-Hassan (Sharifah Fazira's husband)
  Knight Companion of the Order of the Gallant Prince Syed Sirajuddin Jamalullail (DSSJ, 2003)

Malaysia, sultanates and states

Malaysia 

They have been awarded:
 Tuanku Sirajuddin of Perlis (as Yang di-Pertuan Agong of Malaysia) :
  Recipient of the Order of the Royal House of Malaysia (DKM, 13.12.2001)
  Recipient (DMN, 17.4.2000) and Grand Master (13.12.2001 – 12.12.2006) of the Order of the Crown of the Realm
  Grand Master of the Order of the Defender of the Realm (13.12.2001 – 12.12.2006)
   Grand Master of the Order of Loyalty to the Crown of Malaysia (13.12.2001 – 12.12.2006)
  Grand Master of the Order of Merit of Malaysia (13.12.2001 – 12.12.2006)
  Grand Master of the Order for Important Services (Malaysia) (13.12.2001 – 12.12.2006)
  Grand Master of the Order of the Royal Household of Malaysia (13.12.2001 – 12.12.2006)
 Tuanku Fauziah (Tuanku Sirajuddin of Perlis's wife) : 
  Recipient of the Order of the Crown of the Realm (DMN, 13.12.2001)

Sultanate of Johor 
They have been awarded:
 Sultan Sirajuddin of Perlis :
  Knight Grand Commander of the Order of the Crown of Johor (SPMJ)
 Tuanku Fauziah (Sultan Sirajuddin of Perlis's wife) :
  Knight Grand Commander of the Order of the Crown of Johor (SPMJ, before 1967)

Sultanate of Kedah 

They have been awarded:
 Sultan Sirajuddin of Perlis :
  Member of the Royal Family Order of Kedah (DK, 21.1.2002)

Sultanate of Kelantan 

They have been awarded:
 Sultan Sirajuddin of Perlis :
  Recipient of the Royal Family Order or Star of Yunus (DK, 2002)
 Tuanku Fauziah (Sultan Sirajuddin of Perlis's wife) :
   Recipient of the Royal Family Order or Star of Yunus (DK, 2002)

Sultanate of Negeri Sembilan 

 Sultan Sirajuddin of Perlis:
  Member of the Royal Family Order of Negeri Sembilan (DKNS, 19.7.2001)

Sultanate of Pahang 

They have been awarded:
 Sultan Sirajuddin of Perlis :
  Member 1st class of the Family Order of the Crown of Indra of Pahang (DK I, 26.10.2005)
 Tuanku Fauziah (Sultan Sirajuddin of Perlis's wife) :
  Member 1st class of the Family Order of the Crown of Indra of Pahang (DK I, 26.10.2005)

Sultanate of Perak 

 Sultan Sirajuddin of Perlis:
  Recipient of the Royal Family Order of Perak (DK)
  Grand Knight of the Order of Cura Si Manja Kini (the Perak Sword of State, SPCM)

Sultanate of Selangor 

 Sultan Sirajuddin of Perlis:
   First Class of the Royal Family Order of Selangor (DK I, 14.12.2002)

Sultanate of Terengganu 

 Sultan Sirajuddin of Perlis:
 Family Order of Terengganu :  Member first class (DK I)  or  Member second class (DK II) 
  Member Grand Companion of the Order of Sultan Mahmud I of Terengganu (SSMT, 8.10.1998)

Asian honours 
They have been awarded :

Far East

Brunei 
 Sultan Sirajuddin of Perlis (as Yang di-Pertuan Agong of Malaysia, 12/2001–12/2006):  
 Recipient of the Royal Family Order of the Crown of Brunei (DKMB, 11.8.2002)

Cambodia 
 Sultan Sirajuddin of Perlis (as Yang di-Pertuan Agong of Malaysia, 12/2001–12/2006) :
 Grand Collar of the National Order of Independence  (16.12.2002)
 Grand Cross of the Royal Order of Cambodia (16.12.2002)
 Tuanku Fauziah (Sultan Sirajuddin of Perlis's wife) : Grand Cross of the Royal Order of Cambodia (16.12.2002)

Japan 
 Sultan Sirajuddin of Perlis (as Yang di-Pertuan Agong of Malaysia, 12/2001–12/2006) :
 Collar of the Order of the Chrysanthemum (7.3.2005)
 Grand Cordon (or First class) of the Order of the Sacred Treasure (22.2.1970)
 Tuanku Fauziah (Sultan Sirajuddin of Perlis's wife) :
 Grand Cordon of the Order of the Precious Crown (7.3.2005)
 Gold and Silver Star (or Second class) of the Order of the Sacred Treasure (22.2.1970)

Singapore 
 Sultan Sirajuddin of Perlis (as Yang di-Pertuan Agong of Malaysia, 12/2001–12/2006): Order of Temasek (DUT, 11.4.2005)

Middle East

Saudi Arabia 
 Sultan Sirajuddin of Perlis (as Yang di-Pertuan Agong of Malaysia, 12/2001–12/2006): Collar of Badr Chain

Syria 
 Sultan Sirajuddin of Perlis (as Yang di-Pertuan Agong of Malaysia, 12/2001–12/2006): Order of Umayyad (7.5.2004)

American honours 
None known so far

European honours 
They have been awarded:

Croatia 
 Sultan Sirajuddin of Perlis (as Yang di-Pertuan Agong of Malaysia, 12/2001–12/2006) : Recipient of the Grand Order of King Tomislav

Finland 
 Sultan Sirajuddin of Perlis (as Yang di-Pertuan Agong of Malaysia, 12/2001–12/2006) : Commander Grand Cross with Collar of Order of the White Rose of Finland (19.9.2005)

France 
 Sultan Sirajuddin of Perlis (as Yang di-Pertuan Agong of Malaysia, 12/2001–12/2006) : Grand Croix of the National Order of the Legion of Honour (8.5.2004)

Italy 
 Sultan Sirajuddin of Perlis (as Yang di-Pertuan Agong of Malaysia, 12/2001–12/2006) : Knight Grand Cross with Collar of the Order of Merit of the Italian Republic (9.6.2003)
 Tuanku Fauziah (Sultan Sirajuddin of Perlis's wife) : Grand Cross of the Order of Merit of the Italian Republic (9.6.2003)

Spain 
 Tuanku Fauziah (Sultan Sirajuddin of Perlis's wife) : Grand Cross of the Order of Isabel the Catholic (13.5.2004)

Sweden 
  Sultan Sirajuddin of Perlis (as Yang di-Pertuan Agong of Malaysia, 12/2001–12/2006) : Knight of the Royal Order of the Seraphim
 Tuanku Fauziah (Sultan Sirajuddin of Perlis's wife) : Knight of the Royal Order of the Seraphim

African honours 
None known so far

References

Notes 

 
Perlis